The Vicariate Apostolic of Yurimaguas is a Latin Church ecclesiastical territory or apostolic vicariate of the Catholic Church is located in the episcopal see of Yurimaguas in Peru.

History
On 27 February 1921 Pope Benedict XV established the Prefecture Apostolic of San Gabriel de la Dolorosa del Marañón from the Vicariate Apostolic of San León del Amazonas.  The prefecture was elevated to a Vicariate Apostolic by Pope Pius XI on 3 June 1936.  It lost territory in 1946 when the Prefecture Apostolic of San Francisco Javier was established.  The vicariate's name was changed to the Vicariate Apostolic of Yurimaguas on 10 November 1960.

Bishops

Ordinaries
Atanasio Celestino Jáuregui y Goiri, C.P. † (1921 – 30 August 1957)
Gregorio Elias Olazar Muruaga, C.P. † (31 August 1957 – 25 March 1972)
Miguel Irízar Campos, C.P. † (25 March 1972 – 6 August 1989) Appointed, Coadjutor Bishop of Callao
José Luis Astigarraga Lizarralde, C.P. (26 November 1991 – 20 January 2017)
Jesús María Aristín Seco, C.P. (8 July 2020 - present)

Coadjutor Vicar Apostolic
Gregorio Elias Olazar Muruaga, C.P. (1952-1957)

See also
Roman Catholicism in Peru

Sources 

Apostolic vicariates
Roman Catholic dioceses in Peru
Christian organizations established in 1921
1921 establishments in Peru